Dendrographa is a genus of lichen-forming fungi in the family Roccellaceae. It has seven species. It was given its current name by Otto Vernon Darbishire in 1895.

Species
Dendrographa alectoroides 
Dendrographa austrosorediata  – Brazil
Dendrographa conformis 
Dendrographa decolorans 
Dendrographa franciscana 
Dendrographa latebrarum 
Dendrographa leucophaea

References

Roccellaceae
Arthoniomycetes genera
Lichen genera
Taxa named by Otto Vernon Darbishire
Taxa described in 1895